G-flat may refer to:

 G-flat major
 G-flat minor
 The musical pitch G♭